Bezirk Mattersburg is a district of the state of 
Burgenland in Austria.

Municipalities
Towns (Städte) are indicated in boldface; market towns (Marktgemeinden) in italics; suburbs, hamlets and other subdivisions of a municipality are indicated in small characters.
Where appropriate, the  Croatian names are given in parentheses.
 Antau (Otava) (771)
 Bad Sauerbrunn (2,148)
 Baumgarten (Pajngrt) (899)
 Draßburg (Rasporak) (1,141)
 Forchtenstein (Fortnava) (2,806)
 Hirm (953)
 Krensdorf (Kreništof) (592)
 Loipersbach im Burgenland (1,253)
 Marz (1,983)
 Mattersburg (Matrštof) (7,106)
 Walbersdorf
 Neudörfl (4,295)
 Pöttelsdorf (693)
 Pöttsching (Pecva) (2,898)
 Rohrbach bei Mattersburg (2,712)
 Schattendorf (Šundrof) (2,445)
 Sieggraben  (Sigrob) (1,293)
 Sigleß (Cikleš) (1,124)
 Wiesen (Bizmet) (2,787)
 Zemendorf-Stöttera (1,276)
 Stöttera, Zemendorf

 
Districts of Burgenland